James "Jamie" Costin (born 1 June 1977) is an Irish race walker from the Gaeltacht area of Old Parish, County Waterford.

He has qualified to represent Ireland in the 50km Walk at three Olympic Games. Having finished 38th at the 2000 Olympic Games in Sydney, he was unable to compete at the 2004 Olympic Games in Athens following a serious road accident where he broke his back. Fully recovered, he represented Ireland at the 2008 Olympic Games in Beijing. In March 2009, Costin set a new Irish record of 3.50.52 at a race-walking meet in Dudince, Slovakia. He therefore qualified to compete in 2009 World Championships in Berlin.

He is married to Zuzanna Malikova, a Slovak Olympian.

Achievements

External links 
 
 

1977 births
Irish male racewalkers
Olympic athletes of Ireland
Athletes (track and field) at the 2000 Summer Olympics
Athletes (track and field) at the 2008 Summer Olympics
Sportspeople from County Waterford
Living people